This list of dance awards is an index to articles that describe notable awards for dance, including classical and contemporary dance on stage and in films or television shows. It also includes lists of awards for choreography and dance studies. The lists are organized by the country of the sponsoring organization, and most awards are limited to artists in that country.

Dance

Choreography

The following awards are given for choreography in Concert dance performance, musical theatre, plays, films and television shows.

Dance studies

See also

 Lists of awards

References

 
Lists of awards